The Zigana Pass is a mountain pass situated on the Pontic Mountains in Gümüşhane Province close to its border with Trabzon Province in northeastern Turkey. The pass is snow-covered five months a year.

It is one of longest tunnels in the country.

 
Nearby Lake Limni is reachable on foot by a  trail or by car on a  road (partly unpaved) via Kalkanlı village.

On 25 January 2009, an avalanche killed 11 hikers on Mount Zigana.

Zingana pass is the pass through which the Myriads of Xenofon passed through on their way out of Persia ( Ξενοφων «καθοδος των μυριων «) and shouted Thalatta Thalatta ( sea sea) when they saw  the coast of Trabzon (Τραπεζουντα ) at Black Sea

References

Gallery 
Lilies at Zigana Pass

Mountain passes of Turkey
Landforms of Gümüşhane Province